Antonio Saverio De Luca (28 October 1805 – 28 December 1883) was an Italian bishop and prefect of the Pontifical Congregation for Studies as well as Cardinal-Priest of San Lorenzo in Damaso and Cardinal-Bishop of Palestrina.

Biography
Born Bronte, Sicily, he was ordained on 10 February 1839, aged 33, as Priest of Monreale, Italy. On 24 November 1845 he was appointed as Bishop of Aversa. Two months later he was ordained as Bishop of Aversa.

On 22 December 1853, aged 48, he was appointed as Titular Archbishop of Tarsus. On 24 December 1853, aged 48, he was appointed as Apostolic Nuncio to Bavaria. On 9 September 1856 he was appointed Apostolic Nuncio to Austria.

On 16 March 1863, aged 57, he was appointed Cardinal-Priest of Santi Quattro Coronati and elevated to the Cardinalate. On 15 July 1878, he was promoted Cardinal-Bishop of Palestrina by Pope Leo XIII He was named Vice-Chancellor of the Holy Roman Church on the same day, and was granted the titular church of S. Lorenzo in Damaso held in commendam (under administration), a church to which a Vice-Chancellor was usually assigned. He was appointed Prefect of the Congregation for Studies on 13 August 1878.

He died in Rome on 28 December 1883, aged 78.

References

Sources

External links
Catholic Hierarchy 

1805 births
1883 deaths
People from Bronte, Sicily
Bishops in Campania
Apostolic Nuncios to Austria
20th-century Italian Roman Catholic titular archbishops
19th-century Italian cardinals
Cardinals created by Pope Pius IX
Cardinal-bishops of Palestrina
Apostolic Nuncios to Bavaria
Religious leaders from the Province of Catania